Semicassis labiata (formerly also known as Phalium labiatum) is a species of large predatory sea snail, a marine gastropod mollusc. This species is in the subfamily Cassinae, the "helmet shells" and "bonnet shells", which feed on sea urchins.

Subspecies

 Semicassis labiata iheringi (Carcelles, 1953)
 Semicassis labiata labiata (G. Perry, 1811)
 Semicassis labiata zeylanica (Lamarck, 1822)

Distribution
This species occurs in New Zealand

Description
The maximum recorded shell length of Semicassis labiata iheringi is 76 mm.

Habitat
The minimum recorded depth of Semicassis labiata iheringi is 25 m, and the maximum recorded depth is 84 m.

References

 Finlay, H. J. (1928). The Recent Mollusca of the Chatham Islands. Transactions of the New Zealand Institute. 59: 232-286.
 Dautzenberg, Ph. (1929). Mollusques testacés marins de Madagascar. Faune des Colonies Francaises, Tome III 
 MacDonald & Co (1979). The MacDonald Encyclopedia of Shells. MacDonald & Co. London & Sydney.
 Spencer, H.G., Marshall, B.A. & Willan, R.C. (2009). Checklist of New Zealand living Mollusca. Pp 196-219. in: Gordon, D.P. (ed.) New Zealand inventory of biodiversity. Volume one. Kingdom Animalia: Radiata, Lophotrochozoa, Deuterostomia. Canterbury University Press, Christchurch

External links
 Perry G. (1811). Conchology, or the natural history of shells: containing a new arrangement of the genera and species, illustrated by coloured engravings executed from the natural specimens, and including the latest discoveries. 4 pp., 61 plates. London

Cassidae
Gastropods described in 1811